Solar power in Idaho comprised 550 MW in 2019. A 2016 report by the National Renewable Energy Laboratory estimated that rooftops alone have the potential to host 4,700 MW of solar panels, and thus provide 26.4% of all electricity used in Idaho.  A large increase in the state's solar generating capacity began starting year 2015 when 461 MW of solar power was contracted to be built in Idaho.

Net metering is limited to 25 kW for residential users, and 100 kW for commercial users, other than for Avista Utilities customers, where the limit for all users is 100 kW.

Statistics

Installed capacity

Utility-scale generation

Solar Farms

The 80 MWAC (108 MWp) Grandview Solar Farm has been the state's largest facility since its commissioning in 2016.  In 2019, Idaho Power contracted a Power Purchase Agreement for a 120 MW solar power station in 2022 at 2.175¢/kWh.

See also

Wind power in Idaho
Solar power in the United States
Renewable energy in the United States

References

External links
Incentives and Policies

Energy in Idaho
Idaho